SS Irish Pine was the name of two steamships operated by Irish Shipping:

, chartered in 1941, sunk by U-608 in 1942
, built for Irish shipping in 1948

Ship names